Brahmayya or Brahmaiah (Telugu: బ్రహ్మయ్య) is an Indian name and may refer to:

 Gottipati Brahmayya (1889–1984), Indian freedom fighter
 Parvataneni Brahmayya (1908–1980), chartered accountant and founder Brahmayya & Co.

See also
 P. Brahmayya Sastry, Indian professor of physiology
 Kasibhatta Brahmaiah Sastry (1863–1940), Sanskrit and Telugu scholar